is a railway station on the Port Island Line in Kobe, Hyōgo Prefecture, Japan, operated by Kobe New Transit.

Lines
Kobe Airport Station is served by the Port Island Line automated guideway transit.

Station layout
Kobe Airport Station has a single island platform.

Platforms

Adjacent stations

History
Kobe Airport Station opened on February 2, 2006.

See also
 Kobe Airport

Railway stations in Japan opened in 2006
Airport railway stations in Japan
Railway stations in Kobe